The 2021 Internazionali di Tennis Città di Trieste was a professional tennis tournament played on clay courts. It was the 2nd edition of the tournament which was part of the 2021 ATP Challenger Tour. It took place in Trieste, Italy between 26 July and 1 August 2021.

Singles main-draw entrants

Seeds

 1 Rankings are as of 19 July 2021.

Other entrants
The following players received wildcards into the singles main draw:
  Flavio Cobolli
  Robin Haase
  Luca Nardi

The following player received entry into the singles main draw using a protected ranking:
  Julian Lenz

The following players received entry from the qualifying draw:
  Viktor Durasovic
  Pedro Sakamoto
  Timofey Skatov
  Thiago Agustín Tirante

The following player received entry as a lucky loser:
  Orlando Luz

Champions

Singles

 Tomás Martín Etcheverry def.  Thiago Agustín Tirante 6–1, 6–1.

Doubles

 Orlando Luz /  Felipe Meligeni Alves def.  Antoine Hoang /  Albano Olivetti 7–5, 6–7(6–8), [10–5].

References

Internazionali di Tennis Città di Trieste
2021 in Italian tennis
July 2021 sports events in Italy
August 2021 sports events in Italy